Bradenham may refer the following places in England:

 Bradenham, Buckinghamshire
 Bradenham, Norfolk